Mirsad Tuka (born 19 June 1965) is a Bosnian actor. He made his film debut in the comedy-drama Holiday in Sarajevo (1991). Tuka has since appeared in films such as Remake (2003), All for Free (2006), Cirkus Columbia (2010), The Abandoned (2010), Body Complete (2012), Ja sam iz Krajine, zemlje kestena (2013) and Take Me Somewhere Nice (2019).

He has also appeared in television series Složna braća (1996), Zabranjena ljubav (2005–2007) and, most notably, Lud, zbunjen, normalan (2008–2021) as police inspector Murga.

Personal life
Mirsad has been married to Nerma Tuka since 1997, and together they have two sons.

Selected filmography

Film

Television

References

External links

1965 births
Living people
Actors from Tuzla
Bosniaks of Bosnia and Herzegovina
20th-century Bosnia and Herzegovina male actors
21st-century Bosnia and Herzegovina male actors
Bosnia and Herzegovina male film actors
Bosnia and Herzegovina male television actors
Bosnia and Herzegovina male stage actors